La Conquista del Espacio is the twenty-fourth studio album by Argentine singer Fito Páez, released on March 13, 2020, by Sony Music Argentina. The album was produced entirely by Páez, Diego Olivero and Gustavo Borner. The album features guest vocals by Lali and Hernán Coronel of Mala Fama.

In 2021, the album won a Grammy Award for  Best Latin Rock or Alternative Album.

Awards and nominations

Songs

Track listing

References

2020 albums
Grammy Award for Best Latin Rock, Urban or Alternative Album
Latin rock albums
Sony Music albums
Sony Music Argentina albums
Spanish-language albums